Garlic Is as Good as Ten Mothers is a 1980 documentary film about garlic directed by Les Blank. In 2004, the film was selected for preservation in the United States' National Film Registry by the Library of Congress as being "culturally, historically, or aesthetically significant." The Academy Film Archive preserved Garlic Is as Good as Ten Mothers in 1999.

It was filmed at the Gilroy Garlic Festival in Gilroy, California, as well as in other locations in Northern California. Its official premiere was at the 1980 Berlin Film Festival.

The director recommends that, when the film is shown, a toaster oven containing several heads of garlic be turned on in the rear of the theater, unbeknownst to the audience, with the intended result that approximately halfway through the showing the entire theater will be filled with the smell of garlic.

In Blank's 1982 film Burden of Dreams, a documentary chronicling the filming of Fitzcarraldo, director Werner Herzog and other crew members can be seen wearing "Garlic Is as Good as Ten Mothers" T-shirts.

Title
The title is a shortened form of the saying "Garlic is as good as ten mothers... for keeping the girls away."

See also
All in This Tea

References

External links

Garlic Is as Good as Ten Mothers page from Les Blank site
Washington Post article
Garlic Is As Good As Ten Mothers essay by Daniel Eagan in America's Film Legacy: The Authoritative Guide to the Landmark Movies in the National Film Registry, A&C Black, 2010 , pages 763-764 

1980 films
American documentary films
United States National Film Registry films
Films directed by Les Blank
Garlic
1980 documentary films
Documentary films about food and drink
1980s American films